The Bebryces were a tribe of people who lived in Bithynia. According to Strabo they were one of the many Thracian  tribes that had crossed from Europe into Asia, although modern scholars have rather argued for a Celtic origin.

Name 
The name Bebryces could be related to the Celtic tribes Bebruces, living in the Pyrenees, and Briboci, dwelling in Britain, all ultimately stemming from Proto-Celtic *brebu ('beaver'; see Gaulish bebros, bebrus, Old Irish Bibar, 'beaver'). Ivan Duridanov also suggested that the ethnonym was related to Indo-European words meaning "beaver".

History 
According to legend they were defeated by Heracles or the Dioscuri, who killed their king, Mygdon or Amycus.  Their land was then given to King Lycus of the Mariandynians, who built the city Heraclea there.  Some say Amycus was a brother of Mygdon and another Bebrycian king; both were sons of Poseidon and Melia. Greek mythology offers two different accounts for the origin of the name 'Bebryces': either from a woman named Bebryce (Eustath. ad Dionysius Periegetes 805.), or from a hero named Bebryx (or Bebrycus) (Steph. Byz. s.v. Bebrycus). Bebryce is possibly the same as Bryce, a daughter of Danaus, a mythical King of Libya and Arabia (Apollodorus). Bebryx was also the father of Pyrene.

Notes

References 

Strabo, The Geography of Strabo. Edition by H.L. Jones. Cambridge, Mass.: Harvard University Press; London: William Heinemann, Ltd. 1924. Online version at the Perseus Digital Library.
Strabo, Geographica edited by A. Meineke. Leipzig: Teubner. 1877. Greek text available at the Perseus Digital Library.

Legendary tribes in Greco-Roman historiography
Ancient tribes in Thrace
Greek mythology of Anatolia
Bithynia
Mythology of Heracles
Thracian tribes
Celtic tribes